Melitón Albáñez Domínguez Airstrip  is a dirt airstrip located in Ejido Melitón Albáñez Domínguez, Municipality of La Paz, Baja California Sur, Mexico.

Some times the MOA code is used as identifier.

Airports in Baja California Sur
La Paz Municipality (Baja California Sur)